Three-Quarter Ton class was an offshore sailing class of the International Offshore Rule racing the Three-Quarter Ton Cup between 1974 and 1994.

Boats
C&C 3/4 Ton
DB-1
DB-2
SHE 36
UFO 34

See also
Mini Ton class
Quarter Ton class
Half Ton class
One Ton class
Two Ton class
Midget Ocean Racing Club

References

Development sailing classes
Keelboats
Sailing competitions